Fred White (born 1880) was an English professional footballer who spent his entire career playing for his local club Luton Town.

Career

Born in Dunstable, White joined Luton Town as a 20-year-old in 1900. After 257 appearances for the club over nine years, White retired in 1909.

References

1880 births
People from Dunstable
English footballers
Southern Football League players
Luton Town F.C. players
Year of death missing
Date of birth missing
Association football defenders
Footballers from Bedfordshire